Alessandro Ruben (born 14 October 1966) is an Italian politician. He was a member of the Chamber of Deputies from 2008 to 2013.

Early life 
Ruben was born in Rome to a Jewish family.

Political career 
He was elected as a member of The People of Freedom. In 2010 he left and joined Future and Freedom.

Personal life 
He is engaged to cabinet minister Mara Carfagna. They have a daughter together.

See also 

 List of members of the Italian Chamber of Deputies, 2008–2013

References 
Living people
1966 births
21st-century Italian politicians
Deputies of Legislature XVI of Italy
Politicians from Rome
Italian Jews